Susquehecka Creek, once known as Freeburg Creek or Freeburg Run, is a tributary of Middle Creek in Snyder County, Pennsylvania, in the United States. The creek has one named tributary, Dry Run. Part of Susquehecka Creek is impaired by sedimentation/siltation due to agriculture. A number of bridges have been constructed over the creek. Its watershed is designated as a Coldwater Fishery and a Migratory Fishery.

Course

Susquehecka Creek begins in a broad valley known as Pleasant Valley, in Washington Township. It flows east-northeast for a few miles alongside Pennsylvania Route 35, crossing it twice. As the creek nears Freeburg, it receives the tributary Dry Run from the left and turns northeast, entering Freeburg. After a few tenths of a mile, it turns east-southeast for a short distance and reenters Washington Township before turning east-northeast, continuing to follow Pennsylvania Route 35. After more than a mile, the creek arrives at the end of Pleasant Valley and reaches its confluence with Middle Creek.

Tributaries
Susquehecka Creek has one named tributary, which is known as Dry Run.

Hydrology
A reach of Susquehecka Creek is designated as an impaired waterbody. The cause of the impairment is siltation/sedimentation and the likely source of the impairment is grazing-related agriculture.

Geography and geology
The creek is a relatively small stream.

In the middle of the 20th century, the channel of Susquehecka Creek was significantly modified and relocated. The modifications included straightening, adding dikes, cleaning, and widening and deepening. A. Joseph Armstrong's book Trout Unlimited's Guide to Pennsylvania Limestone Streams described the creek as "yet another alleged limestone stream in an area with little appeal".

Watershed
The mouth of the creek is in the United States Geological Survey quadrangle of Freeburg. However, its source is in the quadrangle of Dalmatia.

Flooding has been known to occur along Susquehecka Creek and its tributary Dry Run in the borough of Freeburg.

The designated use of Susquehecka Creek is aquatic life.

History
Susquehecka Creek was entered into the Geographic Names Information System on August 2, 1979. Its identifier in the Geographic Names Information System is 1189115. The creek is also known as Freeburg Creek or Freeburg Run. The former variant name appears in a 1953 United States Geological Survey map. However in 1965, USGS agent William L. Cain discovered that no locals had heard of the name "Freeburg Creek", and that every local he spoke toincluding the then-mayor of Freeburg, a postmaster, a farmer, and a retired manknew the creek as "Susquehecka Creek", though only two people he spoke to knew how to spell it. The name "Susquehecka Creek" had already been in use for many years by 1965.

This bridge replaced a steel bridge built over the creek in 1952.

Biology
The drainage basin of Susquehecka Creek is designated as a Coldwater Fishery and a Migratory Fishery. The creek has been officially proposed for future listing as a wild trout stream.

See also
Kern Run, next tributary of Middle Creek going upstream
List of rivers of Pennsylvania

References

Rivers of Snyder County, Pennsylvania
Tributaries of the Susquehanna River
Rivers of Pennsylvania